The Bellevue District (District 15) is a municipal district in the city of Gatineau, Quebec. It is represented on Gatineau City Council by Alicia Lacasse-Brunet of Action Gatineau. 

The district is located in the Gatineau sector of the city and includes the newer developments in the north-central part of the sector as well as rural area.

Councillors
Richard Côté (2001-2009)
Sylvie Goneau (2009-2017)
Pierre Lanthier (2017-2021)
Alicia Lacasse-Brunet, Action Gatineau (2021-present)

Election results

2021

2017

2013

2009

2005 

Districts of Gatineau